Motoharu (written: ,  or ) is a masculine Japanese given name. Notable people with the name include:

, Japanese kobudoka
, Japanese sport shooter
, Japanese daimyō
, Japanese racing driver
, Japanese cross-country skier
, Japanese naval aviator
, Japanese musician
, Japanese general
, Japanese bass guitarist

Japanese masculine given names